Lankasomatidae, is a millipede family in the suborder Heterochordeumatidea of order Chordeumatida. The family includes 11 species belongs to three genera.

Genera
Cingalosoma
Lankasoma
Nepalella

References

Chordeumatida
Millipede families